Ralph R. McKee Career & Technical Education High School, commonly called McKee or Ralph McKee High School, is located in Staten Island, New York City at 290 Saint Marks Place. The main entrance is located on Belmont Place.  The school is operated by the New York City Department of Education. Ralph McKee is the only Career and Technical Education (CTE) high school on Staten Island. It offers a range of CTE (shop) sequences: Automotive Technology, Construction Technology, Cosmetology, Graphic Arts, Information Technology, and Pre-Engineering. The school opened in 1920, and was named for Ralph R. McKee shortly after his death in 1935. McKee attended Princeton University class of 1887 and served 14 years on the New York City Board of Education.

Curriculum
The curriculum at Ralph R. McKee High School is set up so that all students may take their chosen CTE sequence, while earning a regular or advanced regents high school diploma. Each student is required to take the same classes as the average high school student, with the exception in which the foreign language requirement is only 2 credits (One full year instead of three). This is because each student has their shop class for two consecutive periods each day for their sophomore, junior and senior year. In addition the school operates College Now, a program run by Kingsborough Community College. College Now courses offered include general science, college planning, and sociology. On top of that, McKee is partnered with the College of Staten Island (CSI) in regards to their College Now programs, which take place in the late evening or summer months.

Italian is the only foreign language offered. Students can be placed in an honors program or the Advancement Via Individual Determination (AVID) program.

As of 2012, McKee now offers AP courses in the subject of English Literature and Composition, Government and Politics: United States, United States History and Biology.

CTE Shop Classes
The six shops; Automotive Service Center Specialist,  CAD/Mechanical Technology, Commercial Art/Graphic Design, Construction Trades and Management, Electrical Engineering, and Information Technologies, are all pre-approved programs by the Department of Education and related industries. Each program has their own certification to be obtained by taking a test in their senior year.

Additionally, based on industry and DOE standards, a student graduating from McKee High School may be eligible for a Technical Endorsement seal on their diploma, which is equivalent to work experience of 2 years related to their CTE sequence.

Athletics and extracurricular activities
McKee High School's sports program operates in partnership with Staten Island Technical High School, and their shared teams are known as the MSIT Seagulls. The MSIT teams play various sports including football, soccer, volleyball, wrestling, fencing, swimming, and track. The MSIT Football team won the 1989 and 1991 “B”  Division City Championships as well as the 2010 PSAL Cup Championship, defeating the Petrides School in the latter. They repeated as champions in the 2011 PSAL Cup Championship.

McKee is also a regular competitor in the  FIRST Robotics Competition, placing/winning multiple times throughout the years. Most notably the year 2006 in which McKee High School won at the FIRST Championship, and in 2012, in which they placed at regionals. Further accomplishments of the Robo-wizards are located here and their very own website robowizards.org

Also Ralph McKee High School has joined a CTE school exclusive organization known as SkillsUSA, in which students training in a Career/Technical field can put their classroom experience to the test competing against other students on the city, state, national and even world level.

A complete list of McKee's activities/opportunities/sports to their students:

Alumni and former faculty of McKee

Author Frank McCourt began his teaching career at Mckee and wrote of his experiences there in his books 'Tis and Teacher Man

Kenny Page, class of 1977, is a Staten Island Sports Hall of Fame member and was twice named to the NYC All City basketball team. 

Duane Singleton, class of 1990, was selected in the 5th round of the 1990 Major League Baseball draft and played professionally for the Milwaukee Brewers and Detroit Tigers.

References 
Staten Island and Its People: A History, 1609-1929
Charles William Leng, William Thompson Davis - 1930 - Ever since coming to Staten Island to reside, Ralph R. McKee has evinced a keen interest in the affairs of its local government and in civic and educational movements. Through his efforts, particularly on behalf of education, he has been both.
Minutes of the Board of Estimate and Apportionment. New York (N.Y.). Board of Estimate and Apportionment - 1920 -  ...Ralph R. McKee, Acting President, Borough of Richmond. ... 2), the Board adopted resolutions serving notice upon the Staten Island Midland Railway Company

Public high schools in Staten Island
St. George, Staten Island